"New Born" is a song by English rock band Muse from their second studio album Origin of Symmetry, released in 2001. It was released as the second single from the album on 4 June 2001.

The song proved to be a commercial success, peaking at number 12 on the UK Singles Chart. The song was also featured on the Hullabaloo live DVD.

Background and content

"New Born" is written in the key of E minor. The song starts out at a relatively fast tempo of 147 bpm, and then increases pace during each verse. The melodic introduction features some modern minimalist style piano work. The song is also recognizable for its distinct guitar riff, which is based on a circle of fifths progression.

Regarding the meaning of the song, Matthew Bellamy has said: "It's about a semi-fear of the evolution of technology, and how in reality it's destroying all humanity. My fear is that we can't control it because it's moving faster than we are, so the song's setting myself in a location in the future where the body is no longer important and everyone's plugged into a network. The opening line is 'link it to the world', so it's connecting yourself on a worldwide scale and being born into another reality."

Chris Wolstenholme also said: ""New Born", I think between the three of us is probably one of our favourite tracks off Origin of Symmetry. It is a good live track. I think it's one of the songs which showcases the experimental side of the band. It is not really a conventional pop song. I think a lot of the reason for choosing these songs is that we went for the heavier more direct kind of songs rather than going for anything too mellow".

Recording

"New Born" first started out as a guitar-based piece played in soundcheck during the Showbiz tour back in 1999, and the piano intro was written afterwards. During the recording of the album in the David Bottrill sessions, the band experimented with using Bellamy's voice for the arpeggios instead of the piano, but decided that this was too "abstract" and removed it during post-recording.

Live performances

The live versions of the song are often modified and feature some improvisation and embellishments. In particular, Matt Bellamy usually plays a slightly re-worked piano melody during the introduction. Much of the guitar work is also notably different, the guitar solo is usually extended and more elaborate, and features a "tapping" section before the tremolo. Live versions can also last notably longer, such as the 2007 Wembley Stadium (as seen on the HAARP DVD). "New Born" was a live staple from its debut in 2000 until the end of The Resistance Tour. After this, the song made occasional appearances during The 2nd Law, Psycho Tour, and Drones World Tour. On the band's Simulation Theory World Tour, the song was played in the form of a medley including "Stockholm Syndrome", "Assassin", "Reapers", and "The Handler".

Legacy 

"New Born" was notably featured in the 2003 French horror film Haute Tension. A remixed version of the song can also be heard on the soundtrack for the 2001 thriller Swordfish.

Track listing

 'CD1'
"New Born" – 6:05
"Shrinking Universe" – 3:30
"Piano Thing" – 2:55

 'CD2'
"New Born" – 6:05
"Map of Your Head" – 4:01
"Plug In Baby" (Live) – 3:51

7"
"New Born" – 6:05
"Shrinking Universe" – 3:30

Personnel
Matthew Bellamy – lead vocals, rhythm & lead guitar, keyboards
Chris Wolstenholme – bass, backing vocals
Dominic Howard – drums

EP

"New Born" was released as an extended play (EP) on 5 June 2001 in Greece and Cyprus by Columbia Records.

Track listing 

"New Born"
"Shrinking Universe"
"Piano Thing"
"Map of Your Head"
"Plug In Baby" 
"New Born"

Charts

References

External links
 

Muse (band) songs
2001 singles
Music videos directed by David Slade
Song recordings produced by David Bottrill
2001 songs
Mushroom Records singles
Songs written by Matt Bellamy